Daniel Castañeda Soriano was a Mexican musicologist, composer and engineer.

Soriano was Chief of the Academia de Música Mexicana at the National Conservatory of Music of Mexico in the 1930s. His main interest was focused on Mexican folklore. With the collaboration of Vicente T. Mendoza, he compiled a treatise of Pre-Columbian era instruments, published in 1937 under the name Instrumental Precortesiano.

References
Slonimsky, Nicolas. Music of Latin America

Mexican musicologists
Academic staff of the National Conservatory of Music of Mexico
Year of birth missing
Year of death missing